Wiktor Budzyński (born 7 March 1888, village of Eustachow, near Vilkaviškis – 1976, Puszczykowo, near Poznań) was an ethnic Polish politician, active in the interbellum period in the Republic of Lithuania. He was the leader of Polish minority in Lithuania, also between 1924 and 1927 a deputy to the Seimas, elected from the district of Kaunas.

Budzynski attended schools in Marijampolė and Riga, where he graduated in 1907. Between 1907 and 1911, he studied at Kraków's Jagiellonian University, then returned to his native village and managed a farm. During World War I, he was evacuated to Mohylew, where took care of Polish refugees. After the war Budzynski returned to Lithuania and was elected to the Parliament. Also, from 1924 to 1935 he was the director of Association of Poles in Lithuania Pochodnia. After 1935 he withdrew from social activities.

During World War II he lived in Vilnius, and in 1945 moved to Greater Poland, settling in Puszczykowo, where he died.

Sources
 Jackiewicz Mieczysław, "Polacy na Litwie 1918-2000", Warszawa 2003 
 Buchowski Krzysztof, "Polacy w niepodleglym panstwie litewskim 1918-1940", Białystok 1999

1888 births
1976 deaths
People from Vilkaviškis District Municipality
People from Suwałki Governorate
Lithuanian people of Polish descent
Polish politicians
Members of the Seimas
Jagiellonian University alumni